Mario Lopez (born October 10, 1973) is an American actor and television host. He has appeared on several television series, in films, and on Broadway. He is known for his portrayal of A.C. Slater on Saved by the Bell, Saved by the Bell: The College Years, and the 2020 sequel series. He has appeared in numerous projects since, including the third season of Dancing with the Stars and as host for the syndicated entertainment news magazine shows Extra and Access Hollywood. He has also hosted America's Best Dance Crew for MTV. In 2012, he co-hosted the second season of the American version of The X Factor with Khloé Kardashian, and was the sole host for the third and final season.

Early life, family and education
Lopez was born on October 10, 1973 in Chula Vista, California, the son of Elvira Soledad Trasviña and Mario Alberto López Pérez. Lopez was raised in a Catholic family. His parents are both emigrants from Mexico. His father was born in Culiacán, Sinaloa, and his mother in Tijuana, Territorio Norte de Baja California. His younger sister, Marissa, is married to former NFL Minnesota Vikings and Houston Texans linebacker Kailee Wong.

Lopez started dance education at age three, training in tap and jazz. He also did tumbling, karate and wrestling at his local Boys and Girls Club when he was 7 years old. He excelled at these as well as other activities his mother enrolled him. He placed 2nd in the San Diego Section competition and 7th in California his senior year. He graduated in 1991.

Career
Lopez was discovered by a talent agent at a dance recital when he was 10 years old. He initially worked in local advertisements and commercials before making TV appearances.

Acting
Lopez began acting in 1984 when he appeared as younger brother Tomás in the short-lived ABC comedy series a.k.a. Pablo. That same year, he was cast as a drummer and dancer on Kids Incorporated; he performed on three seasons. In March 1987, he was cast as a guest star on the sitcom The Golden Girls as a Latino boy named Mario who faces deportation. He was cast in a small part in the movie Colors (1988) as Felipe's friend.

Lopez was cast in 1989 as A.C. Slater in the television Saturday-morning series sitcom Saved by the Bell (1989–1993), and its spinoff Saved by the Bell: The College Years (1993–1994), a role which lasted five years. On February 4, 2015, Lopez reunited with Mark-Paul Gosselaar, Elizabeth Berkley, Dennis Haskins, and Tiffani Thiessen on The Tonight Show Starring Jimmy Fallon, where they appeared in a Saved by the Bell sketch with Fallon. In 2020, Lopez reprised the role of A.C. Slater in Peacock's sequel series, Saved by the Bell.

In 1997, Lopez starred as Olympic diver Greg Louganis in the television movie Breaking the Surface: The Greg Louganis Story. The following year, he was cast as Bobby Cruz in the USA Network series Pacific Blue for two seasons before it was cancelled after the fifth season; he then went on to guest star on Resurrection Blvd., Eve, and The Bad Girl's Guide. In March 2006, Lopez joined the cast of the daytime soap opera The Bold and the Beautiful playing the role of Dr. Christian Ramirez. On July 18, 2006, he was released from his B&B contract. Later that year, Mario guest-starred as a plastic surgeon who drives Christian Troy to jealousy when he sees him naked in the shower in an episode of FX Network's Nip/Tuck during the show's fourth season, which began in autumn 2006. He also made an appearance on George Lopez as a police officer in late 2006.

Also in the fall of 2006, Lopez signed on as a contestant on the third season of Dancing with the Stars on ABC with professional partner and then-girlfriend Karina Smirnoff who was making her series debut. They finished in second place, losing to the team of Emmitt Smith and Cheryl Burke.

Lopez and Courtney Mazza had a reality show on VH1 called Mario Lopez: Saved by the Baby which premiered on November 1, 2010. Lopez guest-starred as a reporter for Extra Sesame Street in the Sesame Street episode "The Veggie Monster" in 2012.

In December 2020, Lopez starred as Colonel Sanders in A Recipe for Seduction, a short film from Lifetime and KFC.

Hosting duties

In 1992, he hosted his first series on NBC, called Name Your Adventure. He hosted the serial tabloid Extra, as well as the MTV reality shows America's Best Dance Crew and MTV's Top Pop Group. In the 1995–96 season, he hosted the second season of Masters of the Maze on what was then The Family Channel. Lopez is both the host (with Carmen Palumbo) and co-executive producer of Sí TV's Dating Factory. From October to December 2012, he co-hosted the Fox singing competition The X Factor along with Khloe Kardashian. In September 2013, Lopez returned to the show as sole host for season 3 after Kardashian was not asked back as co-host. The X Factor was cancelled on February 7, 2014. From 2002 to 2005, he was the host of the Animal Planet show Pet Star, despite some difficulty with an allergy to cats. Lopez hosted the Miss America pageant in 2007, 2009, and 2010.

Lopez has guest co-hosted The Wendy Williams Show, and MCed the gala benefit for the 2010 Pageant of the Masters arts festival in Laguna Beach, California.

Starting in 2012, Lopez began hosting his own nationally syndicated radio show, ON With Mario Lopez, for Premiere Radio. It streams online daily on iHeartRadio and airs on selected CHR and Hot AC stations (particularly on KBIG-FM/Los Angeles) throughout the U.S.

In August 2014, Lopez began hosting the Hot AC edition of the iHeartRadio Countdown.

In July 2019, it was reported that Lopez would be leaving his duties hosting Extra in order to host rival program Access Hollywood. In November 2019 Lopez was the Grand Marshal of the Hollywood Christmas Parade.

Stage career
Outside of TV, Lopez made his Broadway debut on April 15, 2008 in the revival of the musical A Chorus Line as Zach.

Books
Lopez has published three non-fiction books. The first, Mario Lopez Knockout Fitness, was published in 2008 and written together with Jeff O'Connell (who had previously written a fitness book with LL Cool J). His book Extra Lean followed in early 2010 and became a New York Times bestseller. Extra Lean Family was published in May 2012.  He released a children's book entitled Mario and Baby Gia by Celebra Children's Books (a division of Penguin Books), on September 27, 2011. The book is about Lopez and his daughter.

Musical
In 2022, it was announced that Lopez is involved in an effort to revive the Puerto Rican boy band Menudo, as he will oversee auditions that will take place, in a project named "Menudo: A New Beginning".

Personal life
According to Lopez, Fergie was his first kiss and the two were involved briefly while they were both on the show Kids Incorporated.

In 1993, Lopez was accused of date rape, but prosecutors found no evidence to support the allegation, and multiple witnesses "contradicted the woman's account of her encounter" with Lopez.

After six years of dating, Lopez married actress Ali Landry on April 24, 2004, in a Catholic ceremony at the Las Alamandas resort outside Puerto Vallarta, Mexico, but their marriage was annulled two weeks later. In a 2011 interview, Lopez admitted that the parting transpired after Landry discovered Lopez was unfaithful to her days before the wedding at his bachelor party. Lopez dated professional dancer Karina Smirnoff, his Dancing with the Stars partner, from 2006 to June 2008.

In the fall of 2008, Lopez met Broadway dancer, actress, and producer Courtney Mazza on A Chorus Line on Broadway in New York. They married in Punta Mita, Mexico on December 1, 2012. They have a daughter (born in 2010) and two sons (born in 2013 and 2019).

Lopez has stated that he is Catholic and goes to church every week. In March 2018, he underwent baptism by immersion at the Jordan River, which was administered by a Catholic priest.

He is a proponent of health and fitness, and was the cover feature for the November 2013 issue of FitnessRX For Men magazine. To complement his fitness regime, Lopez is a boxer and a purple belt in Brazilian Jiu-Jitsu; he began training in early 2017 and received his blue belt in February 2018 under Professor Robert Hill of Gracie Barra Glendale. He received his purple belt in November 2022

Filmography

Film

Television

Awards

References

External links

  
 
 

1973 births
Living people
20th-century American male actors
21st-century American male actors
American game show hosts
American infotainers
American male actors of Mexican descent
American male child actors
American male film actors
American male non-fiction writers
American male soap opera actors
American male television actors
American male voice actors
American practitioners of Brazilian jiu-jitsu
American Roman Catholics
American television sports announcers
Beauty pageant hosts
Boxing commentators
Catholics from California
Entertainment journalists
Hispanic and Latino American male actors
Male actors from California
Male actors from San Diego
Participants in American reality television series
People from Chula Vista, California
People from San Diego